"Flower" is the third single by the Japanese band Orange Range. It was released on October 20, 2004. "Flower" was used as the ending theme of the Japanese movie Ima, Ai ni Yukimasu, known in English as Be with You. "Flower" was used as the eighth ending theme for the third season of Teasing Master Takagi-san (2022), covered by the main character's voice actor, Takahashi Rie. "Flower" was also used as the first ending theme for the original video animation of the 2016 anime, ReLIFE.

Track listing

Charts
"Hana" stayed at number one for many weeks and stayed on the charts for over 50 weeks, to date the most successful single from this group.

References 

2004 singles
Orange Range songs
Oricon Weekly number-one singles
2004 songs
Japanese film songs